Jaldian (also Romanized as Jaldīān, Jaldīyān, and Jaldeyān; also known as Jildīān) is a village in Lahijan-e Gharbi Rural District of Lajan District of Piranshahr County, West Azerbaijan province, Iran. At the 2006 National Census, its population was 1,446 in 269 households. The following census in 2011 counted 1,582 people in 408 households. The latest census in 2016 showed a population of 1,570 people in 434 households; it was the largest village in its rural district.

References 

Piranshahr County

Populated places in West Azerbaijan Province

Populated places in Piranshahr County